A crab puff is a ball of crab meat that has been deep-fried in batter. They are often served in restaurants as an appetizer or side dish.  They may be served alone, or with any of a variety of sauces, such as tartar sauce, cocktail sauce, or sweet and sour sauce.

See also
Crab rangoon
 List of hors d'oeuvre
 List of seafood dishes

References

External links
 "Crab puff sandwich" in Volume Feeding Institutions, Volume 55, 1964.

Crab dishes
Appetizers
Deep fried foods
American seafood dishes